Florrie Burke (7 August 1918 – 24 April 1995) was an Irish footballer who played for Cork United, Cork Athletic and Evergreen United. He also played for both Ireland and the League of Ireland XI. Burke was raised in the Ballintemple, Cork and was a talented junior hurler, playing with Blackrock.
During the Second World War, Burke played for a very successful Cork United team. His United teammates included, among others, Jack O'Reilly, Bill Hayes, Owen Madden, Jackie O'Driscoll, Frank O'Farrell and Tommy Moroney. Burke helped United win several League of Ireland titles and in 1942 they won an FAI Cup / League double. On 17 October 1951, while playing for Cork Athletic, he also helped Ireland to a 3-2 win against West Germany at Dalymount Park. Despite playing a starring role in the game, this was Burke's only international cap.

He subsequently joined Evergreen United after a contract dispute and in 1953 played for  them  in the  first all-Cork FAI Cup final against Athletic.

Honours
Cork United

League of Ireland
Winners 1942, 1943, 1945, 1946, 1951  5
FAI Cup
Winners 1942, 1947 2
League of Ireland Shield
Winners 1943, 1948 2
Munster Senior Cup
Winners 1941, 1945, 1946, 1947 4

Cork Athletic

League of Ireland
Winners 1950  1

References

1918 births
1995 deaths
Association footballers from Cork (city)
Republic of Ireland association footballers
Republic of Ireland international footballers
Ireland (FAI) international footballers
League of Ireland players
Cork United F.C. (1940–1948) players
Cork Athletic F.C. players
League of Ireland XI players
Blackrock National Hurling Club hurlers
Association football defenders